Claremont railway station may refer to:

 Claremont station (California), a Metrolink station in Claremont, California
 Claremont station (New Hampshire), an Amtrak station in Claremont, New Hampshire
 Claremont railway station (Cape Town) in Claremont, Cape Town, South Africa
 Claremont railway station, Perth in Claremont, Perth, Western Australia, Australia

See also
 Claremont (disambiguation)
 Claremont Parkway (IRT Third Avenue Line), former train station